The M-30 orbital motorway circles the central districts of Madrid, the capital city of Spain. It is the innermost ring road of the Spanish city, with a length of 32.5 km. Outer rings are named M-40, M-45 and M-50. Its length and the surface surrounded by the M-30 is comparable to the Boulevard Périphérique of Paris, the Grande Raccordo Anulare of Rome or the London Inner Ring Road.

It has, at least, three lanes in each direction, supplemented in some parts by two or three lane auxiliary roads. It connects to the main Spanish radial national roads that start in Madrid.

The M30 is the busiest Spanish road, famous for its traffic jams, and surrounded by several landmarks such as Torrespaña (one of the tallest structures in Madrid), the national headquarters of IBM, and passed under the Vicente Calderón Stadium.

History
Its construction started in the 1960s and required the underground canalisation of the Abroñigal river, required to avoid flooding since the road runs through the lowest part of the city. In the 1970s the eastern section (Avenida de la Paz) was open between the junction of Manoteras (cross with the A-1, M-11 and accesses to Sanchinarro) and the Nudo Sur (South Junction), that connects to the Avenida de Andalucía (previously N-IV) and A-4.

The second and western section, the Avenida del Manzanares, follows the course of the Manzanares river from the northwestern Puerta de Hierro junction to the junction with the eastern section.

In the 1990s, the ring road was completed with the construction of the northern section, called Avenida de la Ilustración (the only section of the road with traffic lights) from the junction of Puerta de Hierro (accession to Cardenal Herrera Oria street, M40, and El Pardo road) to the junction of Manoteras with the A-1.

In 2003, the highway was transferred from the Government of Spain to the City Council of Madrid. Mayor Alberto Ruiz Gallardón implemented a plan called "Calle 30" (Street 30), converting sections of the highway in the Manzanares course into tunnels, and building an urban park (Madrid Río) in the surface previously occupied by asphalt. From 2005 to 2008, major upgrading works took place, and now a significant portion of the southern part runs underground. They are the longest urban motorway tunnels in Europe, with sections of more than 6 km in length and 3 to 6 lanes in each direction, between the south entry of the Avenida de Portugal tunnel and the north exit of the M-30 south by-pass there are close to 10 km of continuous tunnels. The M30 tunnels run between a point roughly 700 meters north of the junction with A5 motorway and continue all the way up to the junction between M30 and A3 motorway. The total cost of the works was over 7 billion euro.

Urban, economic, environmental and cultural significance

The M-30 surrounds the inner core (the central districts) of Madrid: Centro, Arganzuela, Retiro, Salamanca, Chamartín, Tetuán, and Chamberí, as well as a small part of Moncloa-Aravaca. This core is home to one quarter of the population of Madrid (about 800,000 people) and is, in average, wealthier than the rest of the city. Also, housing prices are higher inside the M-30. Popularily, the city Madrid is divided in dentro de la M-30 (inside the M-30) and fuera de la M-30 (outside the M-30). The M-30 itself is touted by Madrileños and media as a barrier between the rich and the poor sections of the city.

Pay-per-use parking lots and parking meters in Madrid (usually called ORA in Spain, but SER in Madrid) only exist in the area within the M-30. Access by car to the inner core and the M-30 itself may be restricted in days of high air pollution.

Multimedia Gallery

Exit list

The M-30 has the following exits:

References

Transport in Madrid
Transport in the Community of Madrid
Ring roads in Spain